Kordeh Nab (also Romanized as Kordeh Nāb; also known as Gerdeh Nāb, Kardahnāb, Karkhina, Kordeh Nof Eskand, and Kordnāb) is a village in Bonab Rural District, in the Central District of Zanjan County, Zanjan Province, Iran. At the 2006 census, its population was 68, in 17 families.

References 

Populated places in Zanjan County